June Yamagishi (山岸 潤史, born Junshi Yamagishi, June 6, 1953) is a Japanese guitarist based in New Orleans, Louisiana. He is the guitarist for bands Papa Grows Funk and the Wild Magnolias.

History
Yamagishi was born in Ise City, Mie Prefecture, Japan.  He has been active in the Japanese blues and jazz scene since the early 1970s. In 1972, he formed the West Road Blues Band in Kyoto along with vocalist Takashi "Hotoke" Nagai, guitarist Shinji Shiotsugu, bassist Tadashi Kobori, and drummer Teruo Matsumoto. The band soon became one of the main acts in then thriving blues scene in the Kansai region.

In 1975, Yamagishi went on to join a soul band named So Bad Revue, and in 1979, he released the first album under his name titled Really?!.

During the 1980s, he played with bands Myx and Chickenshack (a Japanese band different from the British Chicken Shack) and in the 1990s, he formed the Band of Pleasure with guitarist David T. Walker and drummer James Gadson and released three albums before they disbanded.

In 1995, Yamagishi left his well-established career behind in Japan to live in New Orleans where he still lives today. Since he found his home in the Crescent City, he has played with musicians including Earl King, Henry Butler, Davell Crawford, Marva Wright, George Porter Jr. among many others aside from the two groups he has been a member of.

In 2007, he reunited with West Road Blues Band guitarist Shinji Shiotsugu to record  Together Again - Blues in New Orleans. It was an all blues album recorded in New Orleans, with support from the local musicians including John Gros and Marva Wright.

Yamagishi appeared as himself in two episodes of the HBO series Treme. In the episode titled "Santa Claus, Do You Ever Get The Blues" (season 2, episode 4, 2011) he auditioned for the band The Soul Apostles, and after playing the songs "Fire on The Bayou" and "Love and Happiness" he was successfully employed. He also appeared in the episode titled "Tipitina" (season 3, episode 10, 2012).

On June 7, 2012, he played the Melting Point in Athens, Georgia, along with Martha Reeves, Randall Bramblett, and a host of other musicians celebrating the 60th birthday of Ike Stubblefield.

In February, 2018, Funk on Da Table, Yamagishi's new band consisting of Japanese and American musicians made a tour debut. They released their first CD Live at Tipitina's the following year. Other members of the group were Kenken (bass), John "Papa" Gros (keyboards) and Nikki Glaspie (drums).

Other bands and artists Yamagishi has played with include Corey Henry's Treme Funktet, Davell Crawford, Henry Butler, Marva Wright, and George Porter Jr.

Discography

Solo
1979: Really?! (Flying Dog)
1981: All the Same (Invitation)
1988: Give This Love (Try M)
1993: Jack of the Blues (BMG Victor)
1994: Smokin' Hole (BMG Victor)
2007: Together Again - Blues in New Orleans (Victor Entertainment), with Shinji Shiotsugu

West Road Blues Band
1973: Live In Magazine No.1/2 (Chu Chu Record)
1975: Blues Power (Bourbon)
1975: Live in Kyoto (Bourbon)
1984: Junction (Invitation)
1995: Live in New York (Zain)

Sooo Baad Revue
1976: Sooo Baad Revue (Nippon Phonogram)
1977: Live (Nippon Phonogram)

Chickenshack
1986: Chickenshack I (Meldac)
1986: Chickenshack II (Meldac)
1986: Urban Square (original soundtrack) (Meldac)
1987: Loving Power (Meldac)
1987: Chickenshack III (Meldac)
1988: Chickenshack IV (Meldac)
1989: Chickenshack V (Meldac)
1990: Loving Power II (Meldac)
1990: Chickenshack VI (Meldac)

Band of Pleasure
1992: Live at Kirin Plaza
1994: Band of Pleasure
1995: A Tiny Step

The Wild Magnolias
1996: 1313 Hoodoo Street (AIM)
1999: Life Is a Carnival (Metro Blue)
2002: 30 Years & Still Wild (AIM)

Papa Grows Funk
2001: Doin It'''
2003: Shakin'2006: Live at the Leaf2007: Mr. Patterson's Hat2012: Needle in the GrooveFunk On Da Table
2019 Live At Tipitina's'' (VIVID SOUND)

References

External links
Funk on Da Table official website

1953 births
Living people
Japanese guitarists
Rhythm and blues musicians from New Orleans
Blues musicians from New Orleans
Guitarists from Louisiana
20th-century American guitarists